Switzerland competed at the 2020 Summer Paralympics in Tokyo, Japan, from 24 August to 5 September 2021.

Medalists

Athletics 

Marcel Hug, Manuela Schär and Catherine Debrunner are expected to compete for Switzerland at the 2020 Summer Paralympics.

Men's track

Women's track

Women's field

Badminton 

Cynthia Mathez and Karin Suter-Erath have both qualified to compete.
Women

Cycling 

Sandra Graf, Sandra Stöckl, Fabian Recher, Tobias Fankhauser and Heinz Frei have all qualified to compete.

Equestrian 

Nicole Geiger has qualified to compete.

Shooting 

Nicole Häusler qualified to represent Switzerland at the 2020 Summer Paralympics.

Swimming 

Two Swiss swimmers have successfully achieved Paralympic slots after breaking the MQS.

Men

Wheelchair tennis

See also 
 Switzerland at the Paralympics
 Switzerland at the 2020 Summer Olympics

References

External links 
 2020 Summer Paralympics website

Nations at the 2020 Summer Paralympics
2020
Summer Paralympics